Jean Nicolet (Nicollet), Sieur de Belleborne (October 1642) was a French coureur des bois noted for exploring Lake Michigan, Mackinac Island, Green Bay, and being the first European to set foot in what is now the U.S. state of Wisconsin.

Early life
Nicolet (Nicollet) was born in Cherbourg, France,  in the late 1590s, the son of Thomas Nicollet, who was "messenger ordinary of the King between Paris and Cherbourg", and Marguerite de Lamer. They were members of the Roman Catholic Church. He was a known friend of Samuel de Champlain and Étienne Brule, and was attracted to Canada to participate in Champlain's plan to train young French men as explorers and traders by having them live among Native Americans, at a time when the French were setting up fur trading under the Compagnie des Marchands.

Arrival at Quebec
In 1618, Nicolet immigrated to Quebec as a clerk to train as an interpreter for the Compagnie des Marchands, a trading monopoly owned by members of the French aristocracy. As an employee, Jean Nicolet was a faithful supporter of the Ancien Régime.

To learn the language of the First Nations, Nicolet was sent to live with the Algonquins on Allumette Island, a friendly settlement located along the important Ottawa River fur trade route. Upon his return to Quebec in 1620, he was assigned to live among the Odawa and Algonquin people in the Lake Nipissing region. During his nine-year stay, he ran a store and traded with the native peoples in the area.

He had a relationship with a Nipissing woman, and they had a daughter, whom he named Euphrosine-Madeleine Nicolet. When Nicolet returned to Quebec, he brought his daughter Euphrosine with him to educate her among the French. He worked from there against English interests until the French were restored to power. After Canada was restored to France he married Marguerite Couillard. Marguerite, the daughter of leading Quebec settler Guillaume Couillard and his wife Marie-Guillemette Hébert, was also the goddaughter of Champlain. The couple were residents of Trois-Rivières in later life, where they raised children.

Exploration of Wisconsin

Since 1852, following the historian John Gilmary Shea, Nicolet is noted for being the first European to explore Lake Michigan. In 1634 he became the first European to explore what would become Wisconsin. Jean Nicolet landed at Red Banks, near modern-day Green Bay, Wisconsin, in search of a passage to the Orient. He and other French explorers had learned from their native contacts that the people who lived along these shores were called Ho-Chunk, which some French mistakenly translated as "People of the Sea". In the Ho Chunk language, it means people of the big voice, because they believe their language was the original language of their family of tribal languages.  However, the Ojibwe had a less appealing name for them, Winnebago, or "people of the fragrant waters," translated to French as, Puants or Puans. This exonym was derogatory, however, not knowing that, Nicolet concluded that the people must be from or near the Pacific Ocean, and would provide a direct contact with China.

Nicolet became the French ambassador to the Ho-Chunk people. He wore brightly colored robes and carried two pistols, to convey his authority. The Ho-Chunk people appreciated his ritual display. With some Ho-Chunk guides, Nicolet ascended the Fox River, portaged to the Wisconsin, and travelled down it until it began to widen. So sure was he that he was near the ocean, that he stopped and went back to Quebec to report his discovery of a passage to the "South Sea," unaware that he had just missed finding the upper Mississippi River.

Recent controversy
In the last couple decades, some have questioned the traditional account of Nicolet's arrival in Green Bay, saying that Nicolet was not looking for a route to China, did not wear a Chinese robe, and did not meet the Puans at Red Banks. Ronald Stiebe proposed that Nicolet did not even go to Lake Michigan but that the Puants were actually Algonquin people and Nicolet met them at Keweenaw Bay, Michigan. Nancy Oestreich Lurie, of the Milwaukee Public Museum—followed by Patrick J. Jung, of the Milwaukee School of Engineering (PBS video, "Rethinking Jean Nicolet's Journey to Wisconsin," 2014)—concluded that Nicolet actually met the Puans near Menominee, Michigan. Although the Menominee people and the Puants were different tribes, they were allies who jointly controlled access to Green Bay. Also, the Menominee would have been able to serve as interpreters for Nicolet in negotiations with the Puans. Lurie and Jung propose that the main purpose of Nicolet's mission was to establish peace between New France and the Puants and an alliance against the Iroquois people.

Death
Jean Nicolet drowned after his boat capsized while using it in the ocean travelling and exploring.

Legacy

 Town of Nicolet, Quebec was named after him.
Nicolet Area Technical College in Rhinelander, Wisconsin bears his name.
 Nicolet High School in suburban Milwaukee was named after him.
 In 1950, a statue of him was erected and is now located at Wequiock Falls County Park, about 10 miles northeast of Green Bay and a mile from where it is believed he landed.
 Nicolet's landing at Red Banks is commemorated by a 1910 mural at the Neville Public Museum in Green Bay, Wisconsin.
 In 1906, the Jean Nicolet Chapter of the Daughters of the American Revolution was organized.
 Nicolet National Bank bears his name.
 Nicolet National Forest in northern Wisconsin bears his name.
 Nicolet Beach in Peninsula State Park, Wisconsin, bears his name.
 Nicollet Avenue in Winnipeg, Manitoba, Canada, bears his name.
 There is a high school named after him in Nicolet, Quebec. L'École Secondaire Jean-Nicolet opened in 1968.
 A Liberty ship was launched and named after Jean Nicolet in 1943.

Important Notes

External links

Biography at the Dictionary of Canadian Biography Online
 The Canadian Encyclopedia - Jean Nicollet de Belleborne 
Jean Nicollet de Belleborne (French)  
"MHS Resources: History in Winnipeg Streets"

References
Brook, Timothy (1998), The Confusions of Pleasure: Commerce and Culture in Ming China, Berkeley: University of California Press. 
Jacques Gagnon, Jean Nicollet, Interprète et commis de traite, Montréal, Les Éditions Histoire Québec, 2022, 149 p.

1598 births
1642 deaths
Explorers of Canada
French explorers of North America
17th-century explorers
Nicolet, Quebec
People of New France
People of pre-statehood Michigan
People of pre-statehood Wisconsin
Explorers of the United States